James Brady (1842 – October 7, 1904) was an American soldier who received the Medal of Honor for valor during the American Civil War.

Biography
Brady served in the American Civil War in the 10th Regiment New Hampshire Volunteer Infantry, Irish Regiment, for the Union Army. He was awarded the Medal of Honor on April 6, 1865, for his actions at the Battle of Chaffin's Farm.

Medal of Honor citation
Citation:

Capture of flag.

See also

List of American Civil War Medal of Honor recipients: A-F

References

External links

Military Times

1842 births
1904 deaths
Union Army soldiers
United States Army Medal of Honor recipients
People from Boston
American Civil War recipients of the Medal of Honor